Anne of Great Britain may refer to:
 Anne, Princess Royal (born 1950), member of the British royal family
 Anne, Princess Royal and Princess of Orange (1709–1759), daughter of King George II of Great Britain
 Anne, Queen of Great Britain (1665–1714)

See also
 Princess Anne (disambiguation)
 Queen Anne (disambiguation)